Cositas Buenas is an album featuring Paco de Lucía and directed by Paco de Lucía with the collaboration of Javier Limón. It was released in 2004 labelled "Blue Thumb Records", by Universal Music Spain S.L.

The album has four bulerías, two rumba tracks, a tangos and a tientos. The album won the Latin Grammy Award for Best Flamenco Album.

Track listing
 "Patio Custodio" - Bulerías 4:44
 "Cositas Buenas" (Good little things) - Tangos 4:23
 "Antonia" - Bulería por Soleá 6:28
 "El Dengue" - Rumba 4:03
 "Volar" - Bulerías 5:30
 "El Tesorillo" (The little treasure) - Tientos 4:39
 "Que Venga el Alba" - Bulerías 4:11
 "Casa Bernardo" - Rumba 4:12

Artists 
 Paco de Lucía - Guitar, vocal, lute, mandolin, bouzouki
 Piraña - Percussion
 Guadiana, Antonio el Negro, Montse Cortés, Tana, Potito, Ángela Bautista, and Paco - Palmas and Chorus
 Tomatito- Guitar

Design 
Flamenkos

2004 albums
Latin Grammy Award for Best Flamenco Album